Shona is a 1994 album by Shona Laing released on the TriStar label. It reached No. 35 on the New Zealand album chart. The single "Kick Back" failed to chart.

Track listing
"Rome"
"Kick Back"
"Heat and Smoke"
"Man with the Wild Name"
"Hard World"
"Heartless Bones"
"American Friends"
"Cold Country"
"It's True"
"Decent Thing"
"Hard and Fast"
"Andrew Said"
"Harmlessness"

References

1993 albums
Shona Laing albums
Epic Records albums